The Basehor Sentinel was a local weekly newspaper for Basehor, Kansas. The paper was started and owned by Mike Bell and Paul Massey of Bonner Springs.  The newspaper also maintains an online presence.

References

External links
 

Leavenworth County, Kansas
Newspapers published in Kansas